Halyna Ihorivna Yanchenko (born 29 April 1988) a Ukrainian anti-corruption activist, politician and People's Deputy of Ukraine. She was in elected to parliament in 2019 as number 9 of the election list of Servant of the People. She left the party in December 2022.

From January, 2022 Halyna Yanchenko is a Secretary of the Office of the National Investment Council of Ukraine.

Biography 
Yanchenko studied Sociology at the National University of Kyiv-Mohyla Academy.

In 2008 Yanchenko became head of the local Kyiv branch of the party Democratic Alliance.

Yanchenko is the Chairwoman of the NABU Public Oversight Council.

From 2014 to 2015, she was a member of the Kyiv City Council for Democratic Alliance.

After his election as President of Ukraine in 2019, Volodymyr Zelenskyy introduced Yanchenko as a member of "his team" responsible for "anti-corruption policy and digital decisions".

Yanchenko was elected to the Verkhovna Rada (Ukraine's national parliament) in 2019 as number 9 of the election list of Servant of the People political party. Deputy Head of the Committee on Anti-Corruption Policy at the Verkhovna Rada.

President Zelenskyy tapped her to lead government investment efforts. In January 2022 she was appointed as a Secretary in the Office of the National Investment Council of Ukraine. In addition, she chairs the Temporary Special Commission of the Verkhovna Rada on protecting investor rights.

In the Verkhovna Rada Yanchenko is also a Co-Chair of German-Ukrainian interparliamentary friendship group.

Yanchenko left the parliamentary faction of Servant of the People on 19 December 2022 in protest of the behaviour of party leader Olena Shuliak.

Awards 

2021 – «Statesman of the Year» award, winner in the nomination «The Best Business Initiative in the Public Sphere 2021» from the Kyiv School of Public Administration by Serhiy Nyzhny.

2021 - Honorary award of the I degree of NAAU (National Association of Advocates of Ukraine)

2021 - Special award from CEO Club Ukraine «On protection of the interests of Ukrainian business».

2020 - Thanks from the National Association of Advocates of Ukraine «For significant contribution to the development and strengthening the advocacy institution, high professionalism and active cooperation with lawyers of Ukraine».

See also 
 List of members of the parliament of Ukraine, 2019–24

References

External links 
 Verkhovna Rada  (in Ukrainian)
 

1988 births
Living people
Politicians from Zhytomyr
Politicians from Kyiv
National University of Kyiv-Mohyla Academy alumni
Ukrainian sociologists
Ukrainian women sociologists
Ukrainian anti-corruption activists
Ukrainian women activists
Ninth convocation members of the Verkhovna Rada
Democratic Alliance (Ukraine) politicians
Servant of the People (political party) politicians
Independent politicians in Ukraine
21st-century Ukrainian politicians
21st-century Ukrainian women politicians
People of the Euromaidan
Women members of the Verkhovna Rada